Cooper Street–Rutgers University station is a station on the River Line light rail system, located on Cooper Street in Camden, New Jersey, near the Rutgers–Camden campus. The southbound (westbound) platform is located west of 2nd Street while the northbound (eastbound) platform is east of 2nd Street in the Cooper Grant neighborhood.

The station opened on March 15, 2004. Southbound service from the station is available to the Camden Waterfront. Northbound service is available to the Trenton Rail Station with connections to New Jersey Transit trains to New York City, SEPTA trains to Philadelphia, and Amtrak trains. Access to the PATCO Speedline is available at the Walter Rand Transportation Center.

No connecting service is available at this station. The Trenton-bound platform is across the street from the Walt Whitman Cultural Arts Center.

References

External links

 Station from Google Maps Street View

River Line stations
Railway stations in the United States opened in 2004
2004 establishments in New Jersey
Transportation in Camden, New Jersey
Railway stations in New Jersey at university and college campuses
Railway stations in Camden County, New Jersey